The Hayward station is located in Hayward, North Cowichan, British Columbia. The station was a stop on Via Rail's Dayliner service, which ended in 2011. It is located at the crossing of Drinkwater Road, about 600 metres west of the BC Forest Discovery Centre.

References

External links 
Via Rail Station Description

Via Rail stations in British Columbia
Disused railway stations in Canada